There are many museums in Gyeonggi Province.

Museums

See also
List of museums in South Korea
List of museums in Seoul

 
Gyeonggi